Květa Peschke and Katarina Srebotnik were the defending champions, but chose not to participate this year.
Liezel Huber and Lisa Raymond defeated Raquel Kops-Jones and Abigail Spears 6–3, 6–1 in the final.

Seeds

The top six seeds received bye to the second round.

Draw

Finals

Top half

Bottom half

References
 Main Draw

Qatar Total Open - Doubles
2012 Doubles
2012 in Qatari sport